Chad Jason Hull (January 20, 1973 – December 16, 2012), better known as Josh Weston,  was an American pornographic actor who appeared in gay pornographic films and magazines.

Personal life and career
A native of Nevada, after graduating from college he moved to San Francisco and commenced a career as a personal trainer. He was discovered by adult film producer/director Chi Chi LaRue while dancing at the Nob Hill Theatre. In 2001, he signed an exclusive contract with Falcon Studios.

After the ending of his contract, he worked with a number of bareback and mainstream gay pornography studios.

Weston died at California Pacific Medical Center in San Francisco on December 16, 2012 from septic shock and bacterial endocarditis, which were complications related to his HIV positive status. He was 39. At the time of his death, he was apparently writing a memoir titled Sleeping My Way to the Bottom.

Awards
 2002 Grabby Awards for Best Duo Sex Scene (with Matthew Rush) in Deep South, Part 2
 2003 GayVN Awards Best Actor for Deep South, Part 1
 2003 GayVN Awards Best Three Way (with Jeremy Jordan and Jack Ryan) for Deep South, Part 1
 2007 Grabby Awards for Best Cum Scene for Manly Heat: Scorched

See also 
 List of male performers in gay porn films
 List of pornographic movie studios

References

External links
 
 Josh Weston on the Internet Adult Film Database
 Josh Weston on the Adult Film Database

1973 births
2012 deaths
American actors in gay pornographic films
AIDS-related deaths in California
Deaths from sepsis
Deaths from endocarditis
American male pornographic film actors
People from Sparks, Nevada
Pornographic film actors from Nevada